El Progreso was a radical Chilean newspaper founded by Argentine scholar and writer, Domingo Sarmiento in 1842 during Sarmiento’s exile. Its first publication was printed on November 11.

Overview
El Progreso was funded by the government of Chile. As a result, Sarmiento utilized El Progreso to argue for Chile to occupy the Strait of Magellan, what is now current-day Punta Arenas. Several of Sarmiento’s most-known quotes were words he published in El Progreso.

El Facundo
Sarmiento published El Facundo, his most popular work, in increments in El Progreso in May 1845, before Facundo was published as a book in July 1851. The work was originally published in El Progreso under the title: Civilización y Barbarie. Vida de Juan Facundo Quiroga y aspecto físico, costumbres y hábitos de la República Argentina.
 
El Facundo tells the story of a gaucho, Juan Facundo Quiroga, and his adventures around pastoral Argentina.

References

Spanish-language newspapers
1842 establishments in Chile
Newspapers published in Chile